Bound Brook may refer to:

Bound Brook, New Jersey, a borough in Somerset County
Battle of Bound Brook
Bound Brook (NJT station), a railroad station in the above borough
Bound Brook (Raritan River), a tributary of Green Brook in central New Jersey
Bound Brook (Barnstable County, Massachusetts), a river located by Wellfleet, Massachusetts 
Bound Brook (Massachusetts river), a small river flowing through South Shore (Massachusetts)